is a Japanese cyclist. He competed in two events at the 2000 Summer Olympics.

References

External links
 

1971 births
Living people
Japanese male cyclists
Olympic cyclists of Japan
Cyclists at the 2000 Summer Olympics
People from Maebashi